A hypnic jerk, hypnagogic jerk, sleep start, sleep twitch, myoclonic jerk, or night start is a brief and sudden involuntary contraction of the muscles of the body which occurs when a person is beginning to fall asleep, often causing the person to jump and awaken suddenly for a moment. Hypnic jerks are one form of involuntary muscle twitches called myoclonus. 

Physically, hypnic jerks resemble the "jump" experienced by a person when startled, sometimes accompanied by a falling sensation. Hypnic jerks are associated with a rapid heartbeat, quickened breathing, sweat, and sometimes "a peculiar sensory feeling of 'shock' or 'falling into the void'". It can also be accompanied by a vivid dream experience or hallucination. A higher occurrence is reported in people with irregular sleep schedules. Men have also been known to experience this at a higher rate than women. When they are particularly frequent and severe, hypnic jerks have been reported as a cause of sleep-onset insomnia.

Hypnic jerks are common physiological phenomena. Around 70% of people experience them at least once in their lives with 10% experiencing them daily. They are benign and do not cause any neurological sequelae.

Causes 
According to the American Academy of Sleep Medicine, there is a wide range of potential causes, including anxiety, stimulants like caffeine and nicotine, stress, and strenuous activities in the evening. It also may be facilitated by fatigue or sleep deprivation. However, most hypnic jerks occur essentially at random in healthy people. Nevertheless, these repeated, intensifying twitches can cause anxiety in some individuals and a disruption to their sleep onset.

Sometimes, hypnic jerks are mistaken for another form of movement during sleep. For example, hypnic jerks can be confused with restless leg syndrome, periodic limb movement disorder, hypnagogic foot tremor, rhythmic movement disorder, and hereditary or essential startle syndrome, including the hyperplexia syndrome. But some phenomena can help to distinguish hypnic jerk from these other conditions. For example, the occurrence of hypnic jerk arises only at sleep onset and it happens without any rhythmicity or periodicity of the movements and EMG bursts. Also, other pertinent history allows to differentiate it.

This physiological phenomenon can also be mistaken for myoclonic seizure but it can also be distinguished by different criteria such as the fact that hypnic jerk occurs at sleep onset only or that the EEG is normal and constant. In addition, unlike seizures, there are no tongue bites, urinary incontinence and postictal confusion in hypnic jerk. This phenomenon can therefore be distinguished from other more serious conditions.

Scientists do not know exactly why this phenomenon occurs and are still trying to understand it. None of the several theories that have attempted to explain it has been fully accepted.
One hypothesis posits that the hypnic jerk is a form of reflex, initiated in response to normal bodily events during the lead-up to the first stages of sleep, including a decrease in blood pressure and the relaxation of muscle tissue. Another theory postulates that the body mistakes the sense of relaxation that is felt when falling asleep as a sign that the body is falling. As a consequence, it causes a jerk to wake the sleeper up so they can catch themselves. A researcher at the University of Colorado suggested that a hypnic jerk could be "an archaic reflex to the brain's misinterpretation of muscle relaxation with the onset of sleep as a signal that a sleeping primate is falling out of a tree. The reflex may also have had selective value by having the sleeper readjust or review his or her sleeping position in a nest or on a branch in order to assure that a fall did not occur", but evidence is lacking.

During an epilepsy and intensive care study, the lack of a preceding spike discharge measured on an epilepsy monitoring unit, along with the presence only at sleep onset, helped differentiate hypnic jerks from epileptic myoclonus.

According to a study on sleep disturbances in the Journal of Neural Transmission, a hypnic jerk occurs during the non-rapid eye movement sleep cycle and is an "abrupt muscle action flexing movement, generalized or partial and asymmetric, which may cause arousal, with an illusion of falling". Hypnic jerks are more frequent in childhood with 4 to 7 per hour in the age range from 8 to 12 years old, and they decrease toward 1 or 2 per hour by 65 to 80 years old.

Treatment 
There are ways to reduce hypnic jerks, including reducing consumption of stimulants such as nicotine or caffeine, avoiding physical exertion prior to sleep, and consuming sufficient magnesium.

Some medication can also help to reduce or eliminate the hypnic jerks. For example, low-dose clonazepam at bedtime may make the twitches disappear over time.

In addition, some people may develop a fixation on these hypnic jerks leading to increased anxiety, worrying about the disruptive experience. This increased anxiety and fatigue increases the likelihood of experiencing these jerks, resulting in a positive feedback loop.

See also 
 Exploding head syndrome
 Hypnagogia
 Periodic limb movement disorder
 Rapid eye movement
 Sleep paralysis

References 

Sleep disorders